Xander Yarob Zayas Castro (born September 5, 2002) is a Puerto Rican professional boxer. In an amateur career that spanned from 2007 to 2018 he had more than 130 bouts, winning eleven national championship tournaments including the 2018 U.S. Youth National Championships.

Amateur career

Zayas' involvement with boxing began while living in the Cantera neighborhood of San Juan, Puerto Rico in 2007, when his mother took him to a gym so he could learn to defend himself from bullies. After winning his first amateur fight at the age of six, his career took off, winning 20 consecutive bouts. Zayas dominated the youth circuit for years, gathering the Puerto Rican national title in his division on five occasions. It was after winning his third title at age ten that he decided this would be his profession. As a child, Zayas grew up admiring fellow Puerto Rican Miguel Cotto as he completed a Hall of Fame-career, with the former world champion's fights being the focus of family reunions. He also "used to watch videos of Tito Trinidad, Hector Macho Camacho, Wilfredo Benitez, all those great fighters that made Puerto Rico really proud and happy".

At the age of eleven, he moved to Sunrise, Florida along his mother, sister and stepfather. Zayas enrolled in Sweatbox Boxing & Fitness at Davie. After his first trainer died, Zayas began training under Javiel Centeno, promising he would become his first world champion and demonstrating skills beyond his age. He credits the Nuyorican trainer with "perfecting [his] style with more technical stuff. It was very composed. He sat down and worked on every punch, every combination, every footwork, the head movement. We broke everything down and put it back together like a lego". When queried about the transition, Zayas said "[as] boxing styles, it was difficult at first because the style in Puerto Rico and the style here is very different, I had to adjust to the boxing in the United States. With time I did adjust". In his words, Zayas participated in USA Boxing competitions from this point onwards due to residence. Despite this, he intended to fight in Puerto Rico as a professional as soon as he met the minimum age requirement of 18 years (he was ultimately allowed to fulfill this “dream” a year before meeting this requisite). Zayas went on to win gold medal at the 2017 and 2018 U.S. National Championships.

Inactivity and adjustment

On December 17, 2018, Zayas met with advisor Peter Kahn along his immediate family, having decided to turn professional. A new age requirement of 19 prevented him from pursuing a berth in the 2020 Summer Olympics and the insecurity of boxing's inclusion in 2024 (due to long standing issues regarding the governance of AIBA, which led to a suspension by the IOC) played a role. Kahn had known of the boxer since he was thirteen, through Centeno, and had brought the topic to Bob Arum and Brad Jacobs the month before. By January, several "high-powered promoters" had made offers, but it wasn't until February that Top Rank agreed to the terms that they were requesting, having completed a market study. He became the youngest boxer to sign a contract with the promotional house in the 53 years that had passed since its foundation. Inquired about the signing, Arum first emphasized his maturity, intelligence and overall talent, but also expressed his belief that Zayas could be the "first [great] Hispanic heavyweight champion of the world" due to having open growth plates and fairly tall relatives. Despite considering him a "quality young man" and having a feeling that mirrored his assessment of Oscar De La Hoya coming out of the 1992 Summer Olympics about the possibility of becoming "a big superstar", the promoter urged caution since he was a "work in progress" and the company had never handled someone that young.

After making the decision to turn professional, he spent several months of inactivity and instead became involved in the training camps of other boxers, such as Ivan Baranchyk, Daniyar Yeluessinov, Ryan Martin, George Kambosos and Amir Imam. Meanwhile, the media used epithets that included "prodigy", "próxima gran cosa" (Spanish for "next big thing") and "niño dorado" ("golden boy") to describe Zayas and speculated he could become "The Next Great Puerto Rican Boxing Superstar." Todd duBoef, who was convinced the boxer was not too young to perform after discussing the topic with David McWater, created a merchandising strategy around this perception and modeled it after the one used for Cotto, which included him using Héctor Lavoe's Aguanile (as sung by Marc Anthony) and carrying the flag of Puerto Rico. Zayas embraced the idea, noting that he felt "ready to be that next superstar and to be someone they look up to. I want to make my people in Puerto Rico feel proud to be Puerto Rican and proud to have me as a superstar for them."

Professional career

Under the Top Rank banner, Zayas made his professional debut against previously undefeated (1-0) Genesis Wynn on October 26, 2019, at the Reno-Sparks Convention Center in Reno, Nevada, winning via first round knockout (KO). He recorded two knockdowns prior to the stoppage. A month later, Zayas made his second appearance on November 30 with repeat performance of his debut, this time against Virgel Windfield. Like his previous match, he scored two knockdowns. Zayas’ first decision win was over Corey Champion, put boxing his opponent throughout four rounds for the unanimous nod. 

On February 28, 2020, Zayas had his first fight as a professional in Puerto Rico, scoring a third-round technical knockout over Marklin Bailey. Following a lengthy hiatus caused by the COVID-19 pandemic, he returned to action by defeating Orlando Salgado in the first round on September 4, 2020. The following month, Zayas scored a first-round technical knockout over Anthony Curtiss. Zayas opened the 2021 season by earning an unanimous decision over James Martin in February, going on to score consecutive technical knockouts over DeMarcus Layton and Larry Fryers to close the first half. He concluded 2021 with six fights, outscoring José Luis Sánchez in September before scoring consecutive technical knockouts over Dan Karpency and Alessio Mastronunzio.

Zayas opened 2022, a year where his stated goal is to enter the world ranks, by going the distance to eight rounds for the first time against Quincy Lavallais. He was scheduled to fight for a regional title in the co-main event of a Top Rank card on the eve of the Puerto Rican Day Parade, but withdrew due to a viral infection. On August 13, 2022, Zayas defeated Elías Espadas by technical knockout in five rounds to win the NABO super welterweight championship.

Personal life
Zayas lives with his mother, stepfather and sister in Plantation, Florida. He did not know any English before moving there but it took him only four months to learn, his family translating in social settings. Zayas was only a high school junior when he joined Top Rank, thus he began home schooling to graduate from Plantation High while training for his debut. His mother had set this as a requisite to sign as a professional. The prospect of continuing studies in criminal law was stated in an interview. Outside the ring, Zayas is a gaming enthusiast.

Professional boxing record

References

External links
 

2002 births
Living people
Light-welterweight boxers
Welterweight boxers
Puerto Rican male boxers
People from San Juan, Puerto Rico
Zayas, Xander